Mailhac is a commune in the Aude department in southern France.

Population

Personalities
Its former mayor, Gérard Schivardi, was a candidate in the French presidential election of 2007 but lost the election.

See also
Communes of the Aude department

References

Communes of Aude
Aude communes articles needing translation from French Wikipedia